The "Grönnens laid" is the anthem of the Groningen province of the Netherlands. The anthem was written in 1919 by Geert Teis Pzn. of Stadskanaal, composed by G.R. Jager of Slochteren and arranged by Frieso Molenaar. It is the only Dutch provincial anthem that is officially written in a local dialect, in this case Gronings.

Lyrics

References

1919 songs
Dutch anthems
Regional songs
Symbols of Groningen (province)

de:Provinz Groningen#Hymne